Takan Tappeh (also Romanized as Takān Tappeh) is a village in Behi-e Feyzolah Beygi Rural District, in the Central District of Bukan County, West Azerbaijan Province, Iran. At the 2006 census, its population was 537, in 116 families.

References 

Populated places in Bukan County